The Ovinnik, Joŭnik or Jownik is a malevolent spirit of the threshing house in Slavic folklore whose name derived from ovin 'barn'. He is prone to burning down the threshing houses by setting fire to the grain. To placate him, peasants would offer him roosters and bliny. On New Year's Eve, the touch of an Ovinnik would determine their fortune for the New Year. A warm touch meant good luck and fortune, while a cold touch meant unhappiness.

See also 
 Bannik
 Domovoi
 Slavic mythology

References

Bibliography

Slavic paganism
Slavic tutelary deities